Nationality words link to articles with information on the nation's poetry or literature (for instance, Irish or France).

Events

Works published
 Arthur Johnston, Epigrammata, Scottish poet writing in Latin
 John Lyly, Alexander and Campaspe
 John Milton, "An Epitaph on the Admirable Dramaticke Poet, W. Shakespeare", printed anonymously in the Second Folio of William Shakespeare's plays
 Johannes Narssius, Gustavidos sive de bello Sueco-austriaco libri tres
 Francis Quarles, Divine Fancies: Digested into epigrammes, meditations and observations

Births
Death years link to the corresponding "[year] in poetry" article:
 January 1 – Katherine Philips, née Fowler (died 1664), London-born Anglo-Welsh poet
 August 13 – François-Séraphin Régnier-Desmarais (died 1713), French ecclesiastic, grammarian, diplomat and poet in French, Spanish and Latin
 Étienne Pavillon (died 1705), French lawyer and poet
 Rahman Baba (died 1706), Indian Pashto poet
 Wang Wu (died 1690), Chinese painter and poet
 Wu Li (died 1718), Chinese landscape painter and poet

Deaths
Birth years link to the corresponding "[year] in poetry" article:
 February 23 – Giambattista Basile (born c. 1570), Italian poet, courtier and collector of fairy tales
 February/March – John Weever (born 1576), English poet and antiquary
 July 29 – Samuel Ampzing (born 1590), Dutch clergyman and poet
 August 25 – Thomas Dekker (born 1572), English playwright, writer, pamphleteer and poet
 Ye Wanwan, died this year, according to one source, or in 1633, according to another (born 1610), Chinese poet and daughter of poet Shen Yixiu; also sister of women poets Ye Xiaowan and Ye Xiaoluan
 Last known reference – Henry Reynolds (born 1564), English poet, schoolmaster and literary critic
 Possible date – John Webster (born c. 1580), English Jacobean dramatist and poet

See also

 Poetry
 17th century in poetry
 17th century in literature

Notes

17th-century poetry
Poetry